The Council of Schools and Services for the Blind (COSB) is a consortium of specialized schools in Canada and the United States whose major goal is improving the quality of services to children who are blind and visually impaired.

COSB is a membership organization of special purpose schools for students who are blind or visually impaired, including those with multiple disabilities.

Schools and classrooms specialized approaches to instruction in small group settings ensure that the curriculum is fully accessible to each individual student. COSB schools specialise in teaching the skills that students use to gain independence at the same level as their sighted peers. Known as the Expanded Core Curriculum, these skills such as Orientation and Mobility (travel and movement skills) and the use of Assistive Technology become the tools students use to maximize learning in school and to be fully engaged in their homes and communities.

COSB schools are an example of why the Individuals with Disabilities Education Act (IDEA) calls for a range of educational placement options so that the learning opportunities of students are not restricted by the limitations of any one type of educational setting. Under IDEA students should have the option of attending a school that best matches their learning needs at a particular time in their educational career. An ideal balance is achieved when a student's local public school and that state's COSB school collaborate to allow the student to freely move between settings based upon educational need.

COSB schools provide a variety of services and supports. Key among these are specialized residential and day campuses in most states; short and longer-term program options; outreach services to students and educators in under-served areas; training and networking opportunities for families; professional development programs; the development of specialized curricula and teaching practices; research; braille production; and clearinghouses for instructional materials and public information on blindness.

Member schools
 Alabama Institute for the Deaf and Blind
 Arizona State Schools for the Deaf and Blind
 Arkansas School for the Blind
 Braille Institute of America
 California School for the Blind
 Colorado School for the Deaf and Blind
 Florida School for the Deaf and Blind
 Georgia Academy for the Blind
 Governor Morehead School
 Hadley Institute for the Blind and Visually Impaired
 Idaho Educational Services for the Deaf and Blind
 Illinois School for the Blind and Visually Impaired
 Indiana School for the Blind and Visually Impaired
 Iowa Braille and Sight Saving School
 St. Joseph's School for the Blind
 Junior Blind of America
 Kansas State School for the Blind
 Kentucky School for the Blind
 Lavelle School for the Blind
 Louisiana School for the Visually Impaired
 Maryland School for the Blind
 Michigan Department of Education, Low Incidence Outreach (former Michigan School for the Blind)
 Minnesota State Academy for the Blind
 Mississippi School for the Blind
 Missouri School for the Blind
 Montana School for the Deaf and Blind
 Nebraska Center for the Education of Children Who Are Blind or Visually Impaired
 New Mexico School for the Blind and Visually Impaired
 New York Institute for Special Education
 North Dakota Vision Services/School for the Blind
 Ohio State School for the Blind
 Oklahoma School for the Blind
 Overbrook School for the Blind
 Perkins School for the Blind
 South Carolina School for the Deaf and Blind
 South Dakota School for the Blind and Visually Impaired
 Tennessee School for the Blind
 Texas School for the Blind and Visually Impaired
 Utah School for the Deaf and Blind
 Virginia School for the Deaf and the Blind
 Washington State School for the Blind
 West Virginia Schools for the Deaf and Blind
 Western Pennsylvania School for Blind Children
 Wisconsin Center for the Blind and Visually Impaired

References

Official website
 https://www.cosbvi.org

Schools for the blind in Canada
Schools for the blind in the United States